The following is a list of characters for the Noragami manga and anime series.

Main characters
 

Yato is the titular stray god of the series (Noragami) who wants to build his own shrine. He wears a tracksuit and scarf and refers to himself as "Yato God" (Yatogami). He usually charges five yen (about five cents in U.S. currency), which is what Japanese people usually give when praying at a shrine. Yato was gullible and often wasted his money on scams and good-luck charms that allegedly bring happiness. As he "stopped" being a god of calamity due to his dislike of violence, he is forgotten by most humans. This resulted in Yato developing athazagoraphobia (the fear of being forgotten). Hiyori, a human girl, and Yato's current Regalia (weapon), Yukine, are the two closest people to him, and he is protective of both. He shares a fatherly relationship with Yukine, calling Yukine his child at one point, and becomes extremely attached to Hiyori; romantic feelings are hinted at. Yato also shares a close relationship with Kofuku, the God of Poverty, who is there for him when he is in need of help. Yato's actual name is Yaboku, "Yato" being a name that a previous Regalia mistakenly gave him due to a kanji mix-up. He has been using the name ever since.

Hiyori is a human girl in her third year (9th grade) of middle school, and a high school first-year (10th grade) starting from chapter 25 of the manga. After saving Yato from a bus accident, she becomes a Half-Phantom, involuntarily falling asleep due to her soul slipping out of her body. She is somehow stuck between the human world and the afterlife, something she asks Yato to fix. Because of this, she starts spending more time with him, and he becomes the closest person to her, to the point where she is able to recognize him by scent. Despite it being her best chance to return to normal, Hiyori refuses to have her bond to Yato cut, as it means she will forget him. It is hinted that she has feelings for Yato, as she feels jealous when he almost drunkenly kisses Bishamon, the God of War. Hiyori shares a sisterly relationship with Yukine and tutors him when he expresses a desire to learn. Hikyori Iki is also the main character and narrator of the story, especially so in the manga.

Yukine is Yato's current Regalia. His Regalia form is a katana. Yukine died at a young age, making him miss normal life as a teenager. Every time he sins in any way, Yato suffers injuries. Even though Yato is his master, Yukine does not really show Yato respect as much as how he actually respects him. Yukine comes from a tragic past that only Yato knows about (referenced as the God's secret in the manga). Because of this, Yukine spends a considerable amount of time at war with himself, confronting his pain and ends up blighting both himself and Yato. But after being saved by Hiyori and undergoing an ablution, he becomes more obedient and extremely loyal to Yato, wanting to be a proper Regalia for him. Like Yato, Yukine treasures Hiyori's existence and fears that Hiyori will forget them when she grows up. Yukine later evolves into a Blessed Vessel when he saves Yato from certain death, proving his loyalty to him, and takes the shape of twin katanas.

Gods
Gods in Noragami are gods according to the Japanese belief, who are categorized into several aspects, like war and poverty. They are those who grant human wishes, usually after receiving a prayer and a monetary offering. Their existence depends on humans' faith in them. Gods with shrines do not really die when killed. They are simply reborn, taking the same appearance, but usually growing up from a child form first.

He is the god of academics. He has several Regalia and has his own shrine (where Yato often passes the night), much to Yato's envy. He sometimes assumes human form to intervene if Yato goes out of control playing around. A the beginning, his Regalia were Mayu, Tsuyu, Ayu, Nayu, Miyu y Moyu, but Miyu is cast out and exiled after becoming corrupted by Yukine's darkness and Tsuyu was (temporarily) murdered by the heavens in a trial against Yato.

She is energetic and gentle, but can be fierce and stands up to even Bishamonten if needed. Her regalia is Daikoku. Later, Kofuku and Daikoku take Yato and Yukine in, allowing them to live at their temple.

  

Bishamonten, whose name is often abbreviated to Bishamon and also nicknamed Veena, is the god of combat, taking the form of a woman with long blonde hair. She has many Regalia due to her being unable to abandon spirits attacked by Phantoms, and forms a large group over time, causing her trouble as she cannot tend to all of them properly. She has a strong hate for Yato, as he killed her previous clan of Regalia in the past. Later on in the manga, it is revealed Yato eliminated her Regalia on Kazuma's request to save her life. An argument over who stung Bishamonten resulted in all the other Regalia getting into a massive fight that caused them to develop into a massive phantom. She stops hunting Yato after learning the truth. Despite this, they continue to have a stormy relationship.

She has many Regalia that live at her palatial home, though the ones she uses most often are Kazuma, Akiha, Karuha, Kazuha, Kinuha, Tsuguha and Yugiha. Her Regalia Suzuha befriends Yukine., but Kugaha gets him killed. He then corrupts Aiha and many of her Regalia are devoured by a Phantom invoked by Kugaha. She later revokes Kugaha for his betrayal but saves Aiha by undergoing an ablution.

Rabō is an enigmatic character and appears only in the anime, although he also appears in the manga special Awase Kagami. He is often seen conversing with Nora and has been known to be able to control Phantoms. He is also known as a god of calamity, similar to Yato, and having worked together with him, and seeing him being what he is now making him wanted to bring back the old Yato. After his defeat at the hands of Yato, it is suggested that Rabō simply wanted Yato (his fellow calamity god) to kill him. He is known to kill humans, Regalia, other gods and Phantoms, not caring what the job is, as long as he was wished to do it.

One of Seven Gods of Fortune, who offers to buy Yukine from Yato after he becomes a Blessed Vessel, or even use him as a Nora. He dresses like a businessman, and is rather harsh with his words. Unlike most gods, he has no problems with using Nora. Having been abandoned by his mother Izanami, he views himself as an outcast, and thus sympathizes with them. He plans to use Phantoms as Regalia, and his constant failures in that cause him to reincarnate frequently.

He is a close friend of both Bishamonten and Ebisu. He appears as a big and gruff man with blonde hair who is constantly wearing sunglasses, combined with traditional Japanese clothes. Despite his appearance, however, he is very friendly and fond of rabbits. He is capable of turning into a monstrous spider and is said to be so dangerous even without a Regalia that he was once sealed.

Regalia
A Regalia is a divine weapon possessed by gods. They are former humans that died for a reason against their will (e.g. not through suicide). Regalia change their shape into a unique weapon when their gods called their Regalia name. Usually, each god has a naming scheme to serve as proof that the god wants a specific type of Regalia, and also as an affirmation of a familial bond.

She is Yato's former Regalia, and currently one of Tenjin's Regalia. Despite her harsh attitude toward Yato, she does appear to hold a considerable amount of respect and concern for him. An example of this is when she volunteers to be a part of the ablution required to save Yato's life despite the risks involved. When she was still Yato's Regalia, she was given the name  and transformed into a small dagger. As Tenjin's Regalia, she transforms into a smoking pipe.

He is one of Bishamonten's Regalia and exemplar. He regards Yato as his benefactor, despite Yato being enemies with Bishamonten.

Daikoku is Kofuku's somewhat overprotective Regalia. He regards himself as Kofuku's husband, and once raised a child Regalia with her.

One of the main antagonists of the series. She is Yato's former Regalia. "Nora," meaning "stray," is how the gods call any Regalia who has many masters and thus many names. Because of this, Nora have bad reputations and are the target of prejudice by the gods, but are nevertheless used for tasks that they do not want their own Regalia to be used. Nora was named  by Yato, her Regalia name being , and she still offers herself to be used by him, though he always resists. She causes a lot of trouble, going so far as to destroy Yukine's faith in himself. In the anime, she first tries to kill Hiyori with Phantoms and, when that fails, she erases Hiyori's memory of Yukine and Yato. It is noted that, had she been summoned in the ablution ceremony, she would have killed Yukine. In the manga, it is revealed that she had been Yato's Regalia since he was a child and was Yato's childhood companion.

Kuraha is Bishamonten's Regalia. His Regalia form is a male lion with a scar on his right eye.

A main antagonist of the second season. Kugaha is Bishamonten's former Regalia. He was Bishamonten's doctor, but betrayed her because he wanted to reincarnate Bishamonten and become her new exemplar. His Regalia form is a balance scale. He is actually a Nora and his name "Kuga" was revoked.

Aiha is Bishamonten's Regalia. She was manipulated by Kugaha to help her reincarnate Bishamonten and was severely blighted. Her Regalia form is a silver knight armor used in combat.

Akiha is Bishamonten's Regalia.

Karuha is Bishamonten's Regalia.

Kazuha is Bishamonten's Regalia.

Kinuha is Bishamonten's Regalia.

Tsuguha was Bishamonten's former Regalia.

Yugiha is Bishamonten's Regalia.

Others

Tsuyu is the spirit of a plum tree who has lived with Tenjin for 1,000 years. She is not a Regalia, but rather stays with Tenjin out of a lasting love. Because she is a tree spirit, she is able to communicate with other trees.

Yato and Nora's "father", a third-year student at Hiyori's school, and one of the main antagonists of the series. Fujisaki is actually the name of the youth possessed by Yato and Nora's "father", a human conjurer who lived centuries ago, and who has survived the ages through possessing the bodies of other humans. The conjurer is the sole creator of Yato, having done so through wishing for the cull of humanity, with the purpose of helping him destroy the gods. He is also Yato's lifeline, due to being the only human who clearly remembers the nameless god, which is how Yato has been able to survive these past centuries without followers. The conjurer had been to and returned from Yomi, taking with him the first Phantom Brush (Koto no Ha). He seems to be connected to a woman with freckles, as Izanami uses this woman's looks during his time in Yomi. However, at some point in time, the woman died and this appears to have become his primary reason for loathing gods and, therefore, the wish that created Yato. This seems to be further proven by the fact that in chapter 61, Nana shows sympathy for the conjurer, saying he must have had someone he loved who was killed by the heavens because he wouldn't have called them lowly Gods otherwise.

A student and friend of Hiyori Iki and has known her from childhood. He is uneasy around Yukine and Yato by finding them strange.

A female student who gets bullied by her classmates. She only appeared in the first chapter of the manga and for a brief moment in the first episode of the anime.

References

Noragami